Konstantin Čomu (1865–1952), often credited as Kosta Chomu (Macedonian Cyrillic: Константин Чому) or Konstantin Comu, was an Aromanian cinema operator, the first one in Bitola (present North Macedonia).

Work
The appearance of the cinema in Macedonia dates from the beginning of the 20th century. Ten years after the promotion of this new art at the Grande Caffe in Paris (1895), the cinema arrived in Macedonian soil, thus marking the expansion of the new medium.
The first projection took place as early as 1896, and by the beginning of the 20th century they grew frequent. An increasing number of projectors were owned and operated by certain progressive individuals. At the Balkan, such a person was Konstantin Chomu from Bitola.
Konstantin Chomu opened and operated the first cinema center in Bitola. Among other world wide famous movies, he was projecting the shots and films made from the famous Manaki brothers.

References
1. http://www.macedonia.co.uk/client/index1.aspx?page=26
2. https://web.archive.org/web/20090604022830/http://www.orbis.com.mk/Photography_and__film_activity.htm
3. http://www.unet.com.mk/mian/macult.htm
4. https://web.archive.org/web/20070707112205/http://www.thealbanians.com/cinema/index.htm

1865 births
1952 deaths
People from Bitola
Macedonian businesspeople
Macedonian film people
Aromanian people
Aromanians from the Ottoman Empire
Yugoslav people of Aromanian descent